The 1959–60 Montenegrin Republic League was 15th season of Montenegrin Republic League. Similar to previous season League was organised as tournament, during the April and May 1960.

Season

Qualifiers 
In the qualifiers, 16 teams were placed into three regional groups. Winners of the groups (Zmaj, FK Jedinstvo and Lovćen) qualified for Montenegrin Republic League. Below are the final tables of each qualifying group.

Championship 

At the finals, every team played four games and the winner went to qualifiers for Yugoslav Second League.
Title holder was Lovćen, who finished season with three wins and one draw.

Table

Qualifiers for Yugoslav Second League 
In the qualifiers for 1960–61 Second League – East, Lovćen played in the finals but didn't succeed to gain promotion.

Higher leagues 
On season 1959–60, two Montenegrin teams played in higher leagues of SFR Yugoslavia. Budućnost was a member of 1959–60 Yugoslav First League and Sutjeska played in 1959–60 Yugoslav Second League.

See also 
 Montenegrin Republic League
 Montenegrin Republic Cup (1947–2006)
 Montenegrin clubs in Yugoslav football competitions (1946–2006)
 Montenegrin Football Championship (1922–1940)

References 

Montenegrin Republic League